Krasny Kut is a rural locality (a khutor) in Panikinsky Selsoviet Rural Settlement, Medvensky District, Kursk Oblast, Russia. Population:

Geography 
The khutor is located on the Medvenka (a.k.a.

 Climate
Krasny Kut has a warm-summer humid continental climate (Dfb in the Köppen climate classification).

Transport 

References

Notes

Sources

Rural localities in Medvensky District